Topana may refer to:

Topana, Olt, a commune in Olt County, Romania
Topana (genus), a genus of bush crickets or katydids in the family Tettigoniidae, subfamily Phaneropterinae
Topana Fortress, medieval fortress in Imotski, Croatia